Quartet  is an album by American banjoist Alison Brown, released in 1996.

Reception 

In his AllMusic review, music critic Rick Anderson noted the flexibility of the banjo in jazz and bebop and complimented many tracks. He also noted "This sort of stylistic variety is grist for Brown's mill, but it doesn't always work in her favor: "My Favorite Marsha" (one of several tracks on which she switches to guitar) is nice but borders on new acoustic sappiness—her guitar playing is good but not exceptional."

Grant Alden, of No Depression magazine, had little good to say of the release, calling it "a straightforward jazz record, typical of the bland easy-listening music which now passes for that once dangerous and seductive music. It is distinctive only in that the principal instrument is a banjo, though Brown plays almost entirely without syncopation, and the band wouldn’t know how to swing if they were on a playground."

Track listing 
All compositions by Alison Brown unless otherwise noted.
 "G Bop" (Brown, Burr, Reed, West) – 3:10
 "The Red Balloon" – 3:00
 "My Favorite Marsha" – 3:56
 "Mambo Banjo (Revisited)" – 3:45
 "Without Anastasia" – 3:11
 "Song of Monterrey" – 4:53
 "Minding Rupert" (Brown, Burr) – 3:18
 "The Wonderful Sea Voyage" (Brown, West) – 4:07
 "Hello Mendocino !" – 3:59
 "The Day Sweeps Back" – 3:16

Personnel
 Alison Brown – banjo, guitar
 John Burr – piano, keyboards
 Rick Reed – drums
 Gary West – bass

References

1996 albums
Alison Brown albums
Vanguard Records albums